Sukkiravarapatti is a panchayat village in Sivakasi taluk, Virudhunagar district in the Indian state of Tamil Nadu India.

Nearest towns
 Srivilliputhur 
 Thiruthangal 
 Sivakasi

References

External links
 wikimapia

Villages in Virudhunagar district